Super Twins is a 2007 Philippine television drama fantasy series broadcast by GMA Network. Directed by Dominic Zapata, it stars Jennylyn Mercado, Nadine Samonte, Ella Cruz, Nicole Dulalia and Dennis Trillo. It premiered on February 12, 2007 on the network's Telebabad line up replacing Atlantika. The series concluded on June 1, 2007 with a total of 78 episodes. It was replaced by Impostora in its timeslot.

The series is streaming online on YouTube.

Cast and characters

Lead cast
 Jennylyn Mercado as Super S
 Nadine Samonte as Super T
 Ella Cruz as Tintin
 Nicole Dulalia as Shasha
 Dennis Trillo as Eliazar and Eliseo Vergara

Supporting cast
 Camille Prats as Drew Morales "Drew Barrymore/Drew BarryMorales"
 Patrick Garcia as Billy Vergara
 Tetchie Agbayani as Vesta Paredes
 Ian De Leon as Manuel Paredes
 Tanya Garcia as Aloya Blossom
 Marian Rivera as Ester Paredes / Black Ester
 Luz Valdez as Ising
 Gabby Eigenmann as Rex / Steel  Rex
 Cristine Reyes as Magnesia / Magdalene
 Dominic Roco as Ian
 Felix Roco as Lester
 Mura as Metallad
 John Feir as a policeman
 Robert Villar as Ding

Guest cast
 Antonio Aquitania as a policeman
 Sheena Halili as a reporter
 Bianca King as Katrina Roces
 Melissa Avelino
 Vivienne dela Cruz
 Iwa Moto as Monica / Moshi Moshi Manika
 Arief Yusmita
 Ryan Yllana as Candyman
 Rita Avila as Victoria
 Giselle Sanchez as Jakidaz
 Gene Padilla as Iniyuuuy
 Rey Pumaloy as Boboy Trumpo
 Mel Kimura as Jemma
 Alessandra De Rossi as Nickelina / Nickel
 Biboy Ramirez

References

External links
 
 

2007 Philippine television series debuts
2007 Philippine television series endings
Fantaserye and telefantasya
Filipino-language television shows
GMA Network drama series
Television shows set in the Philippines